André S. Labarthe (18 December 1931 – 5 March 2018) was a French actor, film producer and director. He starred alongside Anna Karina in the 1962 film Vivre sa vie. He was the director of many television documentaries that profile specific individuals, beginning with Cinéastes de notre temps.

Filmography

References

External links
 

1931 births
2018 deaths
French male film actors
French film producers
French film directors
French male screenwriters
French screenwriters
People from Oloron-Sainte-Marie